The 2012 ABSA Under-19 Provincial Championship was contested from 13 July to 27 October 2012. The tournament featured the Under-19 players from the fourteen Currie Cup unions.

Competition

Division A
There were seven participating teams in the 2012 ABSA Under-19 Provincial Championship Division A. These teams played each other twice over the course of the season, once at home and once away.

Teams received four points for a win and two points for a draw. Bonus points were awarded to teams that scored 4 or more tries in a game, as well as to teams that lost a match by 7 points or less. Teams were ranked by points, then points difference (points scored less points conceded).

The top 4 teams qualified for the title play-offs. In the semi-finals, the team that finished first had home advantage against the team that finished fourth, while the team that finished second had home advantage against the team that finished third. The winners of these semi-finals played each other in the final, at the same venue as the 2012 Currie Cup Premier Division Final.

The bottom team in Division A played a play-off game at home against the winner of the Division B final for a place in Division A in 2013.

Division B
There were seven participating teams in the 2012 ABSA Under-19 Provincial Championship Division B. These teams played each other once over the course of the season, either at home or away.

Teams received four points for a win and two points for a draw. Bonus points were awarded to teams that score 4 or more tries in a game, as well as to teams that lost a match by 7 points or less. Teams were ranked by points, then points difference (points scored less points conceded).

The top 4 teams qualified for the title play-offs. In the semi-finals, the team that finished first had home advantage against the team that finished fourth, while the team that finished second had home advantage against the team that finished third. The winners of these semi-finals played each other in the final, at the same venue as the 2012 Currie Cup First Division Final.

The winner of the final played a play-off game away from home against the bottom team in Division A for a place in Division A in 2013.

Teams

Team Listing
The following teams took part in the 2012 ABSA Under-19 Provincial Championship competition:

Division A

Table

Fixtures and results
 Fixtures are subject to change.
 All times are South African (GMT+2).

Regular season

Round one

Round two

Round three

Round four

Round Five

Round Six

Round Seven

Round Eight

Round Nine

Round Ten

Round Eleven

Round Twelve

Round Thirteen

Round Fourteen

Play-off games

Semi-finals

Final

Division B

Table

Fixtures and results
 Fixtures are subject to change.
 All times are South African (GMT+2).

Regular season

Round one

Round two

Round three

Round four

Round Five

Round Six

Round Seven

Play-off games

Semi-finals

Final

Promotion/relegation play-off

  are promoted to Division A.
  are relegated to Division B.

See also
 2012 Currie Cup Premier Division
 2012 Currie Cup First Division
 2012 Vodacom Cup
 2012 Under-21 Provincial Championship

External links

References

2012 rugby union tournaments for clubs
2012
2012 in South African rugby union